Junior Mikamou is a Gabonese amateur boxer. Mikamou won a bronze medal at the 2007 All-Africa Games, losing to Manyo Plange of Ghana.

References

Year of birth missing (living people)
Living people
Gabonese male boxers
Flyweight boxers
African Games bronze medalists for Gabon
African Games medalists in boxing
Competitors at the 2007 All-Africa Games
Competitors at the 2015 African Games
Competitors at the 2019 African Games
21st-century Gabonese people